Etrit Fadil Berisha (born 10 March 1989) is an Albanian professional footballer who plays as a goalkeeper for Serie A club Torino and captains the Albania national team.

Berisha began his career at local club KF 2 Korriku as a youngster, as well also playing youth football with KF KEK before joining Kalmar in 2008, initially as part of their youth setup. He was promoted to the first team in 2010 and soon made his debut for the club and establishing himself as a first team player, making 14 league appearances in his debut season. He cemented his position as the club's first choice keeper during the 2011 Allsvenskan campaign, helping his side achieve a mid table finish as well as reach the 2011 Svenska Cupen Final, which he did not play in and which his side lost. He scored his first professional goal from the penalty spot in a Europa League qualifier against Northern Irish side Cliftonville on 12 July 2012, and he scored another penalty just a month later in the Allsvenskan against Helsingborg. He remained the club's first choice goalkeeper and his performances earned him the Allsvenskan goalkeeper of the year award for the 2013 campaign that saw him score twice from the penalty spot and help his side achieve a fourth-place finish in the league.

In the summer of 2013 Italian club Chievo announced that they had a pre-contract agreement in place with Berisha, but he soon joined their Serie A rivals Lazio on a four-year deal, which caused controversy and led to the player being faced with a six-month suspension, although the case was eventually dropped against him. He competes with Italy international Federico Marchetti for the first choice goalkeeper spot at Lazio, and neither has made the position entirely their own since Berisha's arrival. More recently Lazio's head coach Stefano Pioli has preferred Marchetti, and Berisha's playing time has suffered as a result as he has been limited to fewer appearances than his first season with the club.

Berisha is from Kosovo but is able to represent Albania through his Albanian ethnicity, and he was first called up to the Albania national team in 2012 by Italian head coach Gianni De Biasi where he made his international debut against Iran on 27 May 2012. He was initially a backup goalkeeper for Samir Ujkani, but after just a few games he became Albania's first choice goalkeeper, with Ujkani switching allegiances to represent Kosovo in 2014. He played an instrumental role in Albania qualifying for its first major international tournament, as they reached Euro 2016, becoming a fan favourite in the process.

Club career

Early career
Berisha was born in Pristina, in present-day Kosovo, to ethnic Albanian parents. He began his youth career at age of 8 in local side KF 2 Korriku as a midfielder before switching to a goalkeeper. At 2 Korriku he remained until the club ceased operations during the Kosovo War between 1998 and 1999. He returned to the club after the war once the club was reorganised. The club was experiencing financial difficulties so the youth players, including Berisha, moved to KF KEK in nearby Obilić/Kastriot in 2004, where he would remain until 2 Korriku was able to take in youth players once again in 2007. He soon began training with the first team at 2 Korriku and he was also invited to train with FK Bashkimi in Kumanovo, Macedonia by fellow Kosovar Albanian Bylbyl Sokoli, who was the club's head coach at the time, in order to enjoy better facilities than those found in Kosovo.

Kalmar

Berisha went on trial at Swedish side Kalmar in 2007, and this was made possible by Albert Bunjaki, who was the head coach of the unofficial Kosovo national team as well as being part of the coaching staff at Kalmar. His trial was successful and he was offered a contract by the club, and he initially joined the under-19s side at Kalmar in January 2008 as he was considered too young and inexperienced for first team football at the time and was later during the 2009 season loaned out for a short stint with local Division II club Lindsdals IF to gain first team experience. He impressed in the youth side and was eventually promoted to the first team ahead of the 2010 Allsvenskan, where he was initially regarded as backup to veteran goalkeeper and Kalmar legend, Petter Wastå.

His first taste of first team football came in the first game of the season on 13 March 2010 against IFK Göteborg, where he was an unused substitute in the 3–0 home loss. He remained on the bench until the 9th game week on 28 April where he was handed his professional debut by Nanne Bergstrand against Örebro SK, in a game which his side won 4–1. He experienced a run of six games in goal for Kalmar, and his side went unbeaten during these games. Towards the end of the season he cemented his spot as the first choice goalkeeper with some impressive displays, losing just once during the 14 league games he played in, and keeping seven clean sheets in the process. He also featured in the semi-final of the Svenska Cupen against Hammarby, with the game going to penalties following a 2–2 draw. Kalmar ended up losing 6–5 on penalties, as Berisha failed to save any penalties.

Berisha debuted for Kalmar on 28 April 2010 against Örebro SK and won 4–1. After making fourteen appearances in his debuting season, he became Kalmar's starting goalkeeper. Berisha scored his first goal for Kalmar against Cliftonville in the Europa League qualification rounds and scored his first goal in the Allsvenskan against champions Helsingborgs IF, scoring from the penalty spot in the 38th minute in 2012. But the game resulted in Berisha's worst ever result, with the final score at 7–2. Berisha became a penalty taker at Kalmar and would score all of his goals from the penalty spot.

Berisha played his last game for Kalmar against Halmstads BK on 1 September 2013 and scored from a penalty to give his team the 1–0 victory.

During his time at Kalmar, Club Manager Svante Samuelsson stated that Etrit had developed into a very good goalkeeper during his time at Kalmar, and had worked very determinedly along with the skilled goalkeeper trainer Donald Arvidsson. Berisha was liked by the fans, especially in the 2013 season as he was the main factor in keeping the club at fifth place with a chance for winning the league.

Lazio
On 2 September 2013, Etrit Berisha officially signed for S.S. Lazio in the summer transfer period.

During his debut season for Lazio, Berisha was named as the second choice behind Federico Marchetti by the coach Vladimir Petković. He managed to make his debut on 7 November 2013 in a 2013–14 UEFA Europa League group stage match against Apollon Limassol which resulted in a 2–1 victory for Lazio and Berisha played as a starter to complete the full 90-minutes match although Federico Marchetti was present on the bench. His impressive performance convinced the coach Vladimir Petković to give him another starting place in the next Europa League fixture against Legia Warszawa three weeks later, and Berisha managed to keep the clean-sheet by making some notable saves to help his team to take an away 2–0 win. Once again Berisha played in the Europa League for the third consecutive match, played on 12 December 2013 against Trabzonspor, keeping also another clean sheet in a 0–0 draw. In December 2013 the first choice Federico Marchetti got injured and Berisha gained the chance to make his league debut on 6 January 2014 against Inter Milan under a new coach Edoardo Reja which was appointed on 4 January 2014. Against Inter Milan Berisha played the full 90-minutes match and kept a clean sheet to help Lazio to win 1–0. One week later on 11 January 2014, Berisha played another full match and kept another clean sheet against Bologna, match finished in the goalless draw. His first match in the Coppa Italia came on 14 January 2014 against Parma, a match which Lazio won 2–1. He managed to play also in the next match in Coppa Italia against Napoli valid for the quarter-finals where Lazio lost 1–0 to be eliminated from the competition.

Even though the first choice Marchetti returned from injury, the new coach Edoardo Reja preferred to give Berisha a place in the starting line-up, and Berisha played another full 90 minute match in a 1–1 draw against Juventus on 25 January 2014 in which Federico Marchetti was left on the bench. Berisha continued his impressive performances where on 2 February 2014 he kept another clean sheet against Chievo Verona won 2–0 by Lazio. The peak of his career at Lazio was the Derby della Capitale match against Roma on 8 February 2014; Berisha played the full 90-minutes match and kept the clean sheet as the match finished 0–0 and he was voted as the Man of the match. Then in the Europa League Lazio played against Ludogorets Razgrad in the round of 32 and Berisha was present to play the full 90-minutes match which finished in the 1–0 loss.

Having played regularly for eight matches in total, in March Berisha lost his starting place to Marchetti for three consecutive matches remaining on the bench. However, after these three matches, Marchetti then had injuries and soon after Berisha returned to play for two matches, except for a temporary return of Marchetti against Parma on 30 March 2014, Berisha played in the entire seven remaining matches. On 6 April 2014, Berisha kept a clean sheet in the 2–0 victory against Sampdoria where he played the full 90 minutes. Another clean sheet he made it on 27 April 2014 in an important 2–0 away victory against Livorno. Berisha played in the last match of the season on 18 May 2014, keeping the clean sheet in the victory 1–0 against Bologna with a late penalty score by Lucas Biglia in the 4th minute of stoppage time.

Berisha finished the 2013–14 season making in total 23 full 90-minute matches, including two in Coppa Italia and four in the Europa League and Lazio were ranked in the 9th position of the 2013–14 Serie A. Berisha also was voted as the best foreign goalkeeper of the year and was included in the best eleven of foreign players of the 2013–14 Serie A season.

2014–15 season
In his second season with Lazio, Berisha was named the second choice by newly appointed coach Stefano Pioli, again behind Federico Marchetti, but however was named the first choice for the 2014–15 Coppa Italia. Berisha kept the clean-sheet in his debut of the 2014–15 new season at the match valid for 2014–15 Coppa Italia against Bassano Virtus, finished in the 7–0 victory.
He started the 2014–15 Serie A season again with Lazio playing a full 90-minutes on 31 August 2014 in the opening match against Milan, which finished in the 3–1 loss. Although the coach Stefano Pioli had preferred Federico Marchetti as a first choice during the season, Berisha was enough with only one match suspension of Marchetti to show his impressive form, as he played the full 90-minutes match on 15 February 2015 against Udinese and kept the clean-sheet to be decisive for the 1–0 victory of Lazio with a penalty goal from Antonio Candreva. But it was not over yet because he was selected by Goal.com in the best eleven of the 23rd week Serie A.

During the entire season Berisha managed to play in total ten matches where he kept four clean-sheets and to be notable for Lazio to secure the third place rank, which resulted a place in the 2015–16 UEFA Champions League. In the Coppa Italia, Berisha played the entire seven matches conceding only two goals until the final against the Serie A and Coppa Italia eventual champions, Juventus, where Lazio lost only in the extra-time with a notable goal of Alessandro Matri in the 97th minute.

Atalanta

Following the Lazio's directors decision to keep Marchetti as a starting goalkeeper, Berisha decided to move at Atalanta B.C. for a year loan with buying option, to gain the permanent starting eleven. At Atalanta he made a very impressive season where he kept 11 clean-sheets and an amazing performance during the entire season was the key to Atalanta's success of reaching the 5th place by qualifying for the 2017–18 UEFA Europa League.

He kept a clean sheet against the eventual third place team Napoli on 26 February 2017 with several decisive saves helping Atalanta to take an away win at Stadio San Paolo. Berisha kept the third consecutive clean sheet on 5 March 2017 against Fiorentina mading several notable saves including one crucial save in the first half as Atalanta took a goalless draw which came after five consecutive wins.

On 21 June 2017, Atalanta bought out Berisha on permanent deal for a reported fee of €5 million. Following a very impressive performance in the 3rd game week of the 2017–18 Serie A against Sassuolo, Berisha was rated as the best goalkeeper of the week by including in the best eleven of the week.

S.P.A.L.
On 6 July 2019, Berisha joined SPAL on loan with an obligation to buy.

On 27 November 2020 he tested positive for COVID-19.

Torino
On 3 July 2021, Berisha signed a three-year contract with Torino. The transfer was structured as a one-season loan with a subsequent Torino obligation to buy.

International career

First call-ups and World Cup 2014 qualification
Berisha received his first senior international call up by the Albania national team coach Gianni De Biasi for friendlies against Qatar and Iran in May 2012. He made his debut for Albania against Iran at the İnönü Stadium, Istanbul, Turkey, playing the full 90 minutes and keeping a clean sheet in a 1–0 win. Later next month he received the Albanian citizenship on 1 June 2012 to become eligible to play for Albania national team also in competitive matches. He managed to play also in the next other friendly match against Moldova on 14 August 2012 coming on as a substitute at half-time in place of Samir Ujkani.

Berisha was called up for the first 2014 FIFA World Cup qualification matches against Cyprus and Switzerland in September 2012. However, he was an unused substitute in both matches as the first choice Samir Ujkani played instead. He was called up again for the next two qualifying matches against Iceland and Slovenia in October, where Berisha made his competitive debut against the second on 16th, playing full-90 minutes and keeping a clean sheet with several notable saves which helped Albania win 1–0 at Qemal Stafa Stadium, taking the first ever win against them.

Following this performance, Berisha was promoted first choice goalkeeper for the remaining qualifying matches. On 22 March 2013, in the match against Norway in Oslo, Berisha produced a flawless performance as he made several decisive saves, leading Albania into 1–0 win, the first ever versus them. He managed to play in the remaining five matches, as the dream to qualify to the 2014 FIFA World Cup was shattered as Albania lost three and drew two to end the qualifying campaign in the penultimate place with ten points.

UEFA Euro 2016 campaign
After the qualifiers, fellow goalkeeper Ujkani switched to play for Kosovo, making Berisha the only first choice of Albania, with Shehi as second-hand. Berisha started in Albania's opening UEFA Euro 2016 qualifying match away against Portugal, producing a strong performance as Albania won 1–0 to start the qualifiers for the first time with a win. It was also the first ever win against "Seleção das Quinas". On 14 October 2014, in the matchday 4 away against Serbia, Berisha played as a starter until 42nd minute where the match was postponed due to Serbian fans launching flares onto the pitch. He along with other Albanian players were attacked by Serbian hooligans who came onto the pitch with chairs and other objects. Initially, UEFA awarded Serbia with a 3–0 win, but were deducted three points, leading both Serbia and Albania appeals to the Court of Arbitration for Sport, who on 10 July 2015, awarded Albania with a 3–0 victory and Serbia were still deducted three points.

On 4 September 2015, Berisha made several good saves which ensured Albania a point in the away match against Denmark, which brought the team closer to the "European dream". Berisha was again on goal as Albania suffered two big defeats in the last minutes against Portugal and Serbia, respectively 0–1 and 0–2 with the goals coming in the additional minutes. Following these two defeats, Albania had one last chance to secure qualification in the final qualifying match against Armenia at Vazgen Sargsyan Republican Stadium, where Berisha kept a clean sheet as Albania went to win 3–0 to qualify for the UEFA Euro 2016, its first ever appearance at a major men's football tournament.

On 21 May 2016, Berisha was named in Albania's preliminary 27-man squad for UEFA Euro 2016, and in Albania's final 23-man UEFA Euro squad on 31 May. Later on 11 June 2016, in the first match of Group A against Switzerland, Berisha made an early howler which brought the only goal of the match, a header by Fabian Schär from a corner kick. In the second against the hosts France, Berisha's wall lasted until 90th minute as France scored a late double to seal the 2–0 win. In the third and last group match against Romania, Berisha took his first clean sheet as Albania won 1–0 for first victory in a major football tournament. It was Albania's first win over Romania since 1948. Albania finished the group in the third position with three points and with a goal difference –2, and was ranked last in the third-placed teams, which eventually eliminated them.

2018 FIFA World Cup qualification
Albania's 2018 FIFA World Cup qualification campaign kicked off well, as the team collected all 6 possible points in their first two matches, beating Macedonia 2–1 in the opening match on 5 September 2016 and later Liechtenstein 2–0 away on 6 October where Berisha with his over 18th clean-sheet broke the Arjan Beqaj record for most clean-sheets with Albania. Berisha was involved in two wins and received praises from the media. In the next game against Spain on 10 October, Berisha managed to keep a first-half clean sheet and then ten minutes after the start of the second-half he made a mistake when clearing the ball giving David Silva opportunity to take the ball and to give an immediate pass to Diego Costa who scored at an empty net. Eight minutes later, Spain scored again and enough to take a 2–0 win. However Berisha was praised for his performance which made to avoid a defeat with more goals against a hard opponent such as Spain. On 12 November 2016, during the home game against Israel, Berisha was involved in a physical clash against Israeli striker Eran Zahavi, ultimately knocking him down with a headbutt and being immediately executed and banned from the tournament for an undecided period of time. On 19 December 2016, FIFA took its decision to ban Berisha for two matches and fined him with 5,000 Fr. He missed two next matches against Italy on 24 March 2017 and against Israel on 11 June 2017. On 6 October 2017, on matchday 9 against Spain, due to absence of main captain Ansi Agolli and vice captain Mërgim Mavraj Berisha captained Albania for the first time in a competitive match, graduated by coach Christian Panucci as the most-capped player in the entire starting eleven.

Style of play
Berisha is known for his athleticism in goal, as well as his penalty taking ability, having scored four times and missing once from the penalty spot during his time at Kalmar. He stated that his favourite player and role model is the Dutch goalkeeper Edwin van der Sar.

Controversies
On 31 July 2013, ChievoVerona announced to have signed Berisha during the summer transfer window, but Berisha himself did not accept this, saying that he simply had an accord with the club but did not sign.
On 5 September 2013, after Berisha signed for Lazio, Chievo announced that they had sent the case in to the FIFA. On 11 September 2013, Lazio's president Claudio Lotito declared that Berisha was bought and signed in the regular way according to the Transfer Window rules.

On 14 September 2013, the sport director of Chievo Giovanni Sartori accused Berisha of changing his mind for more money at Lazio. On 29 January 2014, the case was re-opened as now Lazio were looking for another keeper during the winter transfer window. On 31 January 2014, the media announced that Berisha risked a three-month suspension due to contract which he pretended to have signed.

On 5 February 2014, Sartori asked to have this case closed and the accusations dropped. On 20 March 2014, the manager of Kalmar, Svante Samuelson declared that everything about the transfer of their former goalkeeper Etrit Berisha, was regular. On 28 June 2014, the media announced that Berisha's case could be closed as FIFA had not yet made a decision.

Career statistics

Club

International

Honours
Kalmar FF
 Allsvenskan: 2008
 Svenska Supercupen: 2009

Individual
 Allsvenskan Goalkeeper of the Year: 2013
 Serie A Foreign Goalkeeper of the Year: 2013–14

References

External links

Etrit Berisha at the Atalanta B.C.

Etrit Berisha  at the Albanian Football Association

1989 births
Living people
Sportspeople from Pristina
Kosovo Albanians
Association football goalkeepers
Kosovan footballers
Albanian footballers
Albania international footballers
UEFA Euro 2016 players
Allsvenskan players
Kalmar FF players
Serie A players
S.S. Lazio players
Atalanta B.C. players
S.P.A.L. players
Torino F.C. players
Albanian expatriate footballers
Expatriate footballers in Italy
Albanian expatriate sportspeople in Italy
Lindsdals IF players